Dougald D. Kennedy (1879-1941) from Amery, Wisconsin was a member of the Wisconsin State Assembly.

Biography
Kennedy was born Dougald Duncan Kennedy on November 28, 1879 in Osceola, Wisconsin. He died on April 15, 1941. Kennedy is buried in Amery.

Career
Kennedy was a member of the Assembly from 1937 until his death. He was a member of the Wisconsin Progressive Party.

References

People from Osceola, Wisconsin
Members of the Wisconsin State Assembly
Wisconsin Progressives (1924)
20th-century American politicians
1879 births
1941 deaths
People from Amery, Wisconsin